Bill Burton (15 May 1922 – 8 November 2000) was a New Zealand cricketer. He played in one first-class match for Wellington in 1940/41.

See also
 List of Wellington representative cricketers

References

External links
 

1922 births
2000 deaths
New Zealand cricketers
Wellington cricketers
Cricketers from Whanganui